

252001–252100 

|-bgcolor=#f2f2f2
| colspan=4 align=center | 
|}

252101–252200 

|-bgcolor=#f2f2f2
| colspan=4 align=center | 
|}

252201–252300 

|-bgcolor=#f2f2f2
| colspan=4 align=center | 
|}

252301–252400 

|-bgcolor=#f2f2f2
| colspan=4 align=center | 
|}

252401–252500 

|-id=470
| 252470 Puigmarti ||  ||  (born 1932), a Spanish artist of Catalan origin, known for dreamlike and automatic surrealism over six decades of exhibitions throughout five continents || 
|}

252501–252600 

|-bgcolor=#f2f2f2
| colspan=4 align=center | 
|}

252601–252700 

|-bgcolor=#f2f2f2
| colspan=4 align=center | 
|}

252701–252800 

|-id=794
| 252794 Maironis ||  || Maironis (born Jonas Mačiulis; 1862–1932), one of the most famous Lithuanian romantic poets || 
|}

252801–252900 

|-bgcolor=#f2f2f2
| colspan=4 align=center | 
|}

252901–253000 

|-bgcolor=#f2f2f2
| colspan=4 align=center | 
|}

References 

252001-253000